is a passenger railway station located in the town of Ōtoyo, Nagaoka District, Kōchi Prefecture, Japan. It is operated by JR Shikoku and has the station number "D28".

Lines

Layout
The station, which is unstaffed, consists of two side platforms serving two tracks. A building adjacent to one platform serves as a waiting room. A footbridge connects to the other platform.

Adjacent stations

History
At this time the station was operated by Japanese Government Railways, later becoming Japanese National Railways (JNR). With the privatization of JNR on 1 April 1987, control of the station passed to JR Shikoku.

Surrounding area
Japan National Route 32

See also
 List of railway stations in Japan

References

External links

JR Shikoku timetable 

Railway stations in Kōchi Prefecture
Railway stations in Japan opened in 1935
Ōtoyo, Kōchi